Wingate University is a private university with campuses in Wingate, Charlotte, and Hendersonville, North Carolina. It is affiliated with the Baptist State Convention of North Carolina

The university enrolls more than 3,600 students. It offers 37 undergraduate majors as well as eight master's and five doctoral degrees. Academic programs are housed in the Cannon College of Arts and Sciences; the Levine College of Health Sciences; the Byrum School of Business; and the College of Professional Studies, which includes the Thayer School of Education and the School of Sport Sciences.

History 
In 1896, Wingate University began as The Wingate School, a primary and secondary institution founded by the Baptist Associations of Union County, North Carolina, and Chesterfield County, South Carolina, in response to a dearth of locally-available public schools.

The school took its name from Washington Manly Wingate, a former president of Wake Forest College. Following a 2021 decision by Wake Forest University to rename part of its Wait Chapel from Wingate Hall to May 7, 1860, Hall, Wingate University publicly acknowledged Washington Wingate's history as a slaveowner and began efforts to acknowledge their namesake's troubled history.

The Wingate School initially offered a primary and secondary education and continued to do so until the proliferation of public schools in the early 20th century. In 1923, the school began offering the first two years of a baccalaureate education and became Wingate Junior College. The years leading to World War II were difficult for the institution. Though it began receiving financial support from The Baptist State Convention of North Carolina soon after becoming a college, this support was withdrawn during The Great Depression. It was also during this period, in 1932, that the college's administration building was destroyed by fire. The college survived, however, as a result of the work of its administration, faculty, and supporters as well as the post-WWII college enrollment boom. The Baptist State Convention resumed financial support in 1949, and Charles Cannon, a local businessman and philanthropist, began making substantial donations to the college beginning in the 1950s.

In 1952, Wingate Junior College was accredited by the Southern Association of Colleges and Schools, and in 1977, became a four-year institution, Wingate College. The college continued to grow, especially under the leadership of Jerry McGee, added graduate programs, and became Wingate University in 1995. Wingate also has campuses located in Hendersonville, NC, home to graduate programs in pharmacy and physician assistant studies, and Ballantyne, North Carolina.

From its founding, the institution was affiliated with the Baptist State Convention of North Carolina of the Southern Baptist Convention. In 2017, the university began the process of separating from the convention to allow the university's board of trustees to elect its own member. Wingate was among four universities making identical proposals to the convention. Although news reports mentioned that the universities may have made the move to allow for greater flexibility in admitting gay students and non-Baptists, a spokesperson designated by the universities told members of the convention that university presidents "pledge continued fidelity to our Christian heritage and to the Baptist churches of North Carolina."

Academics 
Wingate offers 35 undergraduate majors, 10 pre-professional programs and 38 minors. The university offers five types of bachelor's degrees: Bachelor of Arts, Bachelor of Science, Bachelor of Science in Nursing, Bachelor of Music Education, and Bachelor of Liberal Studies. The university also offers several graduate programs in professional programs. One-in-five Wingate undergraduate students is preparing to be a pharmacist, physician assistant, physical therapist, occupational therapist, or nurse and 65 percent of graduate students are enrolled in health sciences.

Pharmacy
The Wingate University School of Pharmacy is a pharmacy school located in Wingate, North Carolina. The school, part of Wingate University, offers a four-year Doctor of Pharmacy degree (Pharm.D) and is nationally accredited by the Accreditation Council for Pharmacy Education.  As of 2021, tied with 8 other programs, it was ranked #90 among pharmacy colleges in the US.

Physician Assistant
The physician assistant program is offered at both Wingate, North Carolina and Hendersonville, North Carolina campuses. As of 2021, it was ranked #108 among physician assistant programs within the U.S.

Study abroad 
Started in 1978, the university's W'International program allows eligible juniors to take a two-credit-hour seminar, which ends with a 10-day travel experience for $1,500 or less. Wingate also offers language-immersion summer programs in Costa Rica and Quebec.

Athletics 
Wingate student-athletes compete in 22 NCAA Division II sports. These sports include: baseball, softball, men's and women's basketball, men's and women's cross country, men's and women's golf, men's and women's soccer, men's and women's swimming and diving, men's and women's tennis, men's and women's track & field, men's and women's lacrosse, football and volleyball. Wingate's mascot is the Bulldog.

In 2016, the men's soccer team won the school's first team national championship, by defeating University of Charleston 2–0 in the national title game in Kansas City, Missouri.

In 2021, the men's baseball team defeated Central Missouri 5–3 to capture their first world series national championship

Notable alumni

 Sean Barnette, professional basketball player
 John Bowman, Canadian Football League player and two-time Grey Cup champion
 Kenwin Cummings, former NFL player
 Dick Elliott, member of the South Carolina Senate
 Anthony Dean Griffey, four-time Grammy Award-winning singer with the Metropolitan Opera
 Rohit Gupta, film director
 Lorinza "Junior" Harrington, former NBA player
 Jesse Helms, former Republican U.S. senator
 David Jones, former NFL player
 Leon Levine, founder of Family Dollar retail stores
 Richard Lindsay, member of the West Virginia Senate
 Charlie Machell, professional soccer player
 Luke Mulholland, Major League Soccer player
 David Hayes, former Major League Soccer player
 Ken Goodman, member of the North Carolina House of Representatives
 Mike Martin, winningest college baseball coach of all-time
 Alvin Morman, former Major League Baseball pitcher
 Todd Grisham, UFC and Glory kickboxing announcer Todd Grisham

References

External links 
 
 Official athletics website

 
Private universities and colleges in North Carolina
Universities and colleges affiliated with the North Carolina Baptist Convention
Universities and colleges affiliated with the Southern Baptist Convention
Education in Union County, North Carolina
Baptist universities and colleges in the United States
Educational institutions established in 1896
Universities and colleges accredited by the Southern Association of Colleges and Schools
Buildings and structures in Union County, North Carolina
1896 establishments in North Carolina